The True Glory (1945) is a co-production of the US Office of War Information and the British Ministry of Information, documenting the victory on the Western Front, from Normandy to the collapse of the Third Reich.

Although many individuals, including screenwriter and director Garson Kanin, contributed to the film, British director Carol Reed is normally credited as the director. The documentary was promoted with the tagline, "The story of your victory...told by the guys who won it!" The film won the Academy Award for Best Documentary Feature.

Format
The documentary film is notable for using multiple first-person perspectives as narrative voices, somewhat in the manner of Tunisian Victory (1944). However, in The True Glory, instead of just an American G.I. and a British Tommy, the voices include a Canadian, a French resister, a Parisian civilian family, an African-American tank gunner, and several female perspectives including a nurse and clerical staff. The film is introduced by General Dwight D. Eisenhower, Supreme Commander of Allied Forces in Europe. Prominent commentators include General George S. Patton; Best Actor Tony nominee and American Theatre Hall of Fame and Grammy Hall of Fame Broadway and film star Sam Levene; two-time Academy Award-winning film actor and director, Peter Ustinov; and three-time Academy Award-winning playwright Paddy Chayefsky.

The title is taken from a letter of Sir Francis Drake, which is quoted in a final caption: "There must be a beginning of any great matter, but the continuing unto the end until it be thoroughly finished yields the true glory."

See also 
List of Allied propaganda films of World War II

References

Further reading

External links 

, posted by the National Archives and Records Administration

1945 films
American World War II propaganda films
British World War II propaganda films
American documentary films
Black-and-white documentary films
British documentary films
Best Documentary Feature Academy Award winners
1940s English-language films
Films directed by Carol Reed
American black-and-white films
Columbia Pictures films
Films scored by William Alwyn
1945 documentary films